Jeremy McGrath Supercross 2000 is a motocross racing video game developed by Acclaim Studios Salt Lake City and published by Acclaim Entertainment under their Acclaim Sports label for Nintendo 64, Game Boy Color, PlayStation and Dreamcast. It features eight stadium tracks, eight outdoor tracks, and an option for players to create their own custom tracks. In addition to having a racing game mode, players could perform dirt bike tricks in a stunt mode.

Reception 

The Dreamcast and PlayStation versions received "generally unfavorable reviews" according to the review aggregation website Metacritic. Doug Trueman of NextGen said that there was "no doubt" that the former console version "will boost sales of Excitebike 64." Vicious Sid of GamePro said of the Nintendo 64 version, "While not a groundbreaking supercross title, McGrath is a big improvement over most dirt-bike racers. In a suddenly bustling genre, McGraths intuitive gameplay and well-rounded modes help it stand out from the crowd."

Notes

References

External links 

2000 video games
Acclaim Entertainment games
Dreamcast games
Game Boy Color games
Motorcycle video games
Nintendo 64 games
Off-road racing video games
PlayStation (console) games
Multiplayer and single-player video games
Video games developed in the United States